National Route 425 is a national highway of Japan connecting Owase, Mie and Gobō, Wakayama in Japan, with a total length of 206.2 km (128.13 mi).

References

National highways in Japan
Roads in Mie Prefecture
Roads in Nara Prefecture
Roads in Wakayama Prefecture